Collomb is a surname. Notable people with the surname include:

 Bernard Collomb (1930–2011), French Formula One driver
 Gérard Collomb (born 1947), French politician
 Bertrand P. Collomb (1942–2019), French business executive

See also
 Collom
 Colomb